is a Japanese actress, singer, and songwriter.

Career
In 1997 she debuted as an actress in the television drama . The next year she played the role of Chisa Noda in the Hideaki Anno film Love & Pop. Kirari wrote "Last Piece" as the end theme for the anime series Great Teacher Onizuka, and she played Nanako in the first live TV version of GTO. Her cover of Martika's Toy Soldiers reached number 18 on the Oricon charts in May 2000.

Shortly afterward she put her career on hold and withdrew from Japanese public life.

Personal life
Fifteen years later she revealed that she had been ill with cervical cancer, and after recovery had moved to Taiwan, married her husband, and had a child.

References

External links
Personal blog 

1980 births
Japanese actresses
Japanese expatriates in Taiwan
Japanese women pop singers
Living people
People from Okinawa Island
Musicians from Okinawa Prefecture
People from Okinawa Prefecture
21st-century Japanese singers
21st-century Japanese women singers